Barni is a comune (municipality) in the Province of Como in the Lombardy region of Italy.

Barni borders the following municipalities: Lasnigo, Magreglio, Oliveto Lario and Sormano.

Demographic evolution

References

Cities and towns in Lombardy